is a vertical-scrolling shooter arcade game developed and published by Tecmo in 1992. It is the third and final entry in its Star Force series, and retains many of the same mechanics as its predecessors. Players control the two space fighter ships Blue Nova and Red Nova. There are three different power-ups to choose from called "Pulsators". The power meter itself charges up automatically to increase their fighters' power.

Reception
Game Machine listed Final Star Force as being Japan's eighteenth most popular arcade game of December 1992. Jay Carter of Electronic Game magazine compared its gameplay to Xevious, and liked the game's bright and detailed backdrops. However, the game's mostly negative reputation and poor sales led to Tecmo pulling it from sale shortly after its release.

Notes

References

External links

1992 video games
Arcade video games
Arcade-only video games
Cooperative video games
Multiplayer and single-player video games
Shoot 'em ups
Tecmo games
Video games developed in Japan
Video games scored by Hiroshi Miyazaki